Ahman Rashad Green (born February 16, 1977) is an American former football running back who played 12 seasons in the National Football League (NFL). Green played college football for the Nebraska Cornhuskers and was drafted by the Seattle Seahawks in the 3rd round of the 1998 NFL Draft, playing there for two seasons before being traded to the Green Bay Packers, with whom he played for eight of the next ten seasons. Green also played for the Houston Texans, and was a four-time Pro Bowl selection with the Packers, where he holds the franchise record for rushing yards. He was the head esports coach at Lakeland University until the end of the 2022.

Early years
Green was born in Omaha, Nebraska, and attended Omaha North before transferring to Omaha Central for high school. He was a high school All-American selection and state 'Player of the Year' as a senior.

In addition to football, he also ran track and field. He currently holds the 10th fastest 100 meter dash ever in the state of Nebraska, at 10.61 seconds.

Green also competed in powerlifting in high school, placing 2nd in the ADFPA High School National Powerlifting Championships in Des Moines, Iowa.

College career
Green was a standout running back and three-year starter for the University of Nebraska Cornhuskers. He was an integral component and key contributor on two national championship squads.

Freshman (1995)
As a freshman, Green was perhaps overshadowed by his backfield mates running back Lawrence Phillips and quarterback Tommie Frazier. He was a major contributor during Nebraska's 1995 championship run. He rushed for 1,086 yards (still the school's single-season freshman rushing record) and 13 touchdowns on 141 carries (7.7 avg.) and was honored as a freshman All-America selection by Football News. In addition, he earned Big Eight all-conference and 'Freshman of the Year' honors.

Sophomore (1996)
As a sophomore in 1996, Green compiled a team-leading 917 yards on 155 carries and seven touchdowns, despite a turf toe injury. Green had a career-high 214 yards against Iowa State University that season.

Junior (1997)
As a junior, Green garnered All-Big 12 Conference recognition and was named second-team All-America by the Associated Press and The Sporting News as Nebraska again captured the national championship. He was a finalist for the Doak Walker Award, the annual honor for college football's top running back, in 1997. During that campaign he carried the ball 278 times for 1,877 yards (6.8 avg.) and 22 touchdowns (a school record for juniors). He posted 12 consecutive 100-yard games, including three contests with over 200 yards (he also had 99 yards on nine carries in the opener against Akron).

During his collegiate career, Green compiled 3,880 rushing yards and 42 touchdowns, both totals good for second place on the Cornhuskers' all-time list. He also posted 300 receiving yards and three touchdowns on 35 catches. One of Green's best collegiate performances came on January 2, 1998, in the Orange Bowl. He rushed for an Orange Bowl record 206 yards and two touchdowns in Nebraska's 42–17 victory over #3 Tennessee, breaking the previous 20-year-old record of 205 yards held by Arkansas running back Roland Sales. Green was also named the 1998 Orange Bowl MVP. The performance marked the Cornhuskers' record-setting third national championship in four years.

College statistics

Provided by CFB at Sports Reference: View Original Table
Generated June 27, 2017.

Bowl games 
Green played in a bowl game each season he was at Nebraska. In the 1996 Fiesta Bowl, he rushed for 68 yards and one touchdown. In the 1996 Orange Bowl (played at the end of the year), he rushed for 52 yards, and in the 1998 Orange Bowl, he rushed for 206 yards and two touchdowns.

Professional career

Seattle Seahawks (1998-1999)
Green was drafted in the third round (76th overall) of the 1998 NFL Draft by the Seattle Seahawks. Although Green produced a high rushing average (6.0 in 1998 and 4.6 in 1999) he had difficulty earning significant playing time behind established veteran Ricky Watters.

Green Bay Packers (2000-2006)

In 2000, Green was traded along with a fifth round draft pick to the Green Bay Packers for Fred Vinson and a sixth round pick. He was selected to the NFL Pro Bowl from 2001 to 2004 and broke several franchise records. From the time he joined the Packers in 2000 up through the end of the 2004 season, Green gained more yards from scrimmage (9,036) and rushing yards (6,848) than any other NFL player. Green's highest rushing touchdown per game total came in 2002, when he scored three in a 30-9 win versus the then-Washington Redskins. In 2003, he had his best year as a professional and set the Green Bay franchise record by running for 1,883 yards in the regular season, and three of his highest rushing yardage games came that season (218, 192, 176). That year, he became the first and only player in NFL history to record at least 1,850 rushing yards, average 5.0 yards per carry, score 20 touchdowns and catch 50 passes in one season. He threw a touchdown pass on October 17, 2004 vs. the Detroit Lions. During his time with the Packers, Green became one of two players in NFL history to have two touchdown runs of 90 or more yards (Bo Jackson is the other). Despite his injury-shortened 2005 season, the Packers re-signed Green to a one-year, $2 million contract, with an extra $3 million in incentives. After the 2006 season he became a free agent.

Houston Texans (2007-2008)
On March 4, 2007 Green signed a four-year, $23 million deal with the Houston Texans. He was reunited with his former head coach and former Texans' assistant head coach Mike Sherman along with former Packers running back Samkon Gado. He was asked to handle the bulk of the load at running back after a 2006 season in which the Texans used a "running back by committee" approach. Across his two seasons with the Texans, Green rushed 144 times for 554 yards and two touchdowns and also caught 25 passes for 155 yards.

On February 10, 2009, Green was released by the Texans.

Green Bay Packers (second stint, 2009)
Ahman Green officially re-signed with the Green Bay Packers on October 21, 2009, after the Packers placed running back DeShawn Wynn on injured reserve. With his former number, 30, taken by fullback John Kuhn, Green wore No. 34, the same number as former Chicago Bears running back Walter Payton, whom Green idolized as a young player. On November 8, 2009 Green broke Jim Taylor's record to become the all-time leading rusher in Packer history. In his final NFL season, Green was primarily used in a reserve role, rushing 41 times for 160 yards and one touchdown and also catching 3 passes for 18 yards.

Omaha Nighthawks (2010)
Green joined the Omaha Nighthawks of the United Football League for the 2010 season. He was a part of the Nighthawks' 40-man protected roster, started 8 games for the Nighthawks.

Montreal Alouettes (2011)
On February 7, 2011, the Montreal Alouettes of the Canadian Football League announced they signed Green to a tryout contract, signing Green to an official contract in March of that year. Green was released on Sunday of training camp on June 5, 2011 after arriving with an injured hamstring.

Retirement 
Green announced his retirement from football in August 2011.

NFL career statistics
Rushing statistics

Receiving statistics

Green Bay Packers franchise records

 Most rushing yards, career: 8,322
 Most rushing yards at Lambeau Field, career: 4,507
 Most rushing yards at Lambeau Field, game: 218, vs. Denver Broncos, December 28, 2003
 Longest run from scrimmage at Lambeau Field, game: 98, vs. Denver Broncos, December 28, 2003
 Most rushing yards in a season: 1,883, 2003

Accolades

High school 

 Gatorade Circle of Champions Nebraska Player of the Year (1995)
 Offensive Player of the Year (1994, Lincoln Journal Star)
 Nebraska Male High School Athlete of the Year (1994–95, Omaha World-Herald)
 2× First-team All-Nebraska (Omaha World-Herald)
 2× First-team Super-State (Lincoln Journal Star)
 Parade All-American
 USA Today First-team All-American
 Bluechip Illustrated Dream Team, also Bluechip's top running prospect
 Reebok, Schutt High School, SuperPrep All-American

College 

 2× Bowl Alliance national championships, 1995, 1997
 2nd Team All-American, 1997
 Honorable Mention All-American, 1995
1998 Orange Bowl MVP
 Big 8 Offensive Freshman of the Year, 1995
 Doak Walker Award finalist, 1997
 First-team All-Big 12, 1997
 First-team All-Big 8, 1995 Coaches Poll
 Second-team All-Big 8,1995 AP Poll
 Third-team All-Big 12, 1996

Professional 

 4× Pro Bowl selection, 2001-2004
 NFC Offensive Player of the Year, 2003
Green Bay Packers Hall of Fame inductee

Personal life
Green was named after former NFL wide receiver and current broadcaster Ahmad Rashad. He has an uncle, Michael Green, who also attended Nebraska as a running back in the late 1960s. His uncle was drafted by the San Diego Chargers, but never appeared in a game.

In 2003, Green completed his undergraduate degree at Nebraska after taking classes at the University of Wisconsin–Green Bay, receiving a bachelor's degree in geography.

On September 21, 2012, Green was inducted into the University Of Nebraska Football Hall of Fame and was inducted into the Green Bay Packers Football Hall of Fame on July 19, 2014.

Green has lived in Green Bay since his retirement, and is an avid video-gamer and comic book fan – so much so that his nickname is "Batman", illustrated further by a calf tattoo of the superhero. He operates a sports training facility in the city, and serves as a spokesman for the Wisconsin Alzheimer's Association. From 2012 to 2014, Green served as co-owner of the Green Bay Blizzard, an arena football team.

In 2006, Green played a small role in the film Big Stan as the prisoner Lee Otis. Green also had a small role in Batman v Superman: Dawn of Justice as an unnamed thug, but his scene was cut from the final version of the film.

On June 26, 2017, Green was arrested on charges of child abuse and disorderly conduct after his daughter (from a previous marriage) claimed Green pushed her and struck her in the head over a dispute about chores. Green eventually entered a plea bargain where he pled no contest to reduced charges of criminal damage to property and disorderly conduct, claiming that he did not want to subject his daughter to a jury trial. He received 18 months probation. 

In February 2020, Green was named head coach of Lakeland University's new varsity esports team.

In November 2021, Green hosted the finals of the first ever Mid-America Gamers Expo in Council Bluffs.

References

External links

 
 
 
 
 
 
 Official Ahman Green Foundation website
 Twitch Stream

Sportspeople from Omaha, Nebraska
Players of American football from Nebraska
American football running backs
Nebraska Cornhuskers football players
Seattle Seahawks players
Green Bay Packers players
Houston Texans players
Omaha Nighthawks players
National Conference Pro Bowl players
African-American Muslims
1977 births
Living people
Omaha Central High School alumni
Esports coaches